Iskandar Khatloni (October 1954 – September 21, 2000) was a journalist from Tajikistan who worked for Radio Free Europe and was murdered in Moscow, Russia while covering the Second Chechen War.

Life
In the 1980s at the onset of glasnost in the Soviet Union Khatloni began worked as a BBC correspondent. In 1996, he became a correspondent for the Tajik language division of the Prague-based Radio Free Europe. In addition to his journalistic work, Khatloni was a distinguished poet and had published four volumes of verse.

Before his death, Khatloni had been assigned to Moscow to report on human rights abuses in Chechnya.

Murder

On the evening of 22 September 2000 Khatloni was attacked inside his Moscow apartment by an unknown, axe-wielding assailant. Khatloni was struck twice in the head and then stumbled onto the street and collapsed. He was later found by a passerby and taken to Moscow's Botkin Hospital, where he died that night of a serious head wound.

Speculation surrounding Khatloni's murder has focused on his coverage of the war in Chechnya, a politically sensitive topic that brought great peril to Russian-based journalists covering the subject. Just the previous spring, Igor Domnikov of Novaya Gazeta had been murdered while covering abuses by the Russian armed forces in Chechnya. Radio Free Europe's coverage of the Chechen conflict had caused the Russian Media Ministry to declare earlier in the year that the independent radio station was "hostile to our state." Moscow police opened an investigation of Khatloni's murder, but no arrests were ever made in the case.

Khatloni was survived by his wife Kimmat and a daughter from a previous marriage.  He was buried in his native Tajikistan.

See also
List of journalists killed in Russia
List of journalists killed in Tajikistan

References

External links 
RFE/RL Correspondent Killed In Moscow (September 22, 2000)

Assassinated Tajikistani journalists
Tajikistani writers
20th-century Tajikistani poets
Tajikistani male writers
Soviet journalists
1954 births
2000 deaths
Tajikistani people murdered abroad
People murdered in Moscow
Journalists killed in Russia
20th-century poets
20th-century journalists
Maxim Gorky Literature Institute alumni
2000 murders in Russia